The Province of Lecco is a province in the Lombardy region of Italy. Its capital is the city of Lecco.

As of 2017, the province had a population of 337,211 on a surface of  divided into 85 comuni (municipalities).

History
The Province of Lecco was established by the President of the Republic in Decree No. 250 of 6 March 1992. Elections for the appointment of the first President of the Province of Lecco were held on 23 April 1995 (1st round) and 7 May 1995 (runoff). The proclamation of the 1st President, Mario Anghileri, occurred on 9 May 1995.

Geography
The Province of Lecco is situated in northern central Italy. It is bordered to the north and west by the Province of Como, to the east and north with the Province of Sondrio, to the east by the Province of Bergamo, and to the south with the Province of Monza and Brianza. The province of Lecco has an area of only , with some  located across the Adda River, in Valsassina. The remaining land is  located in the Oggionese, the Casatese, and the Meratese, with an additional  belonging to the municipality of Oliveto Lario, located on the other side of Lake Como, in Vallassina, within the pre-Alpine Lecchese.  70% of the province is mountainous and the other 30% is hilly. In the east of the province is Monte Serrada and the Resegone di Lecco,  with its characteristic shape reminiscent of the teeth of a saw.

The province contains numerous lakes, with Lake Como and Lake Annone in the comunes of Garlate and Olginate. To the west, the comunes of Rogeno, Bosisio Parini, and Cesana Brianza overlook Lake Pusiano. There is also an abundance of rivers, including the main Adda river and the Lambro, running through Costa Masnaga, Rogeno, and Nibionno. Other smaller rivers are the Molgora, the Bévéra, a tributary of the Lambro, the Pioverna flowing in Valsassina, and Varro flowing in Val Varrone.

Towns of Brianza in the province 
Airuno, Annone di Brianza, Barzago, Barzanò, Bosisio Parini, Brivio, Bulciago, Calco, Casatenovo, Cassago Brianza, Castello di Brianza, Cernusco Lombardone, Cesana Brianza, Civate, Colle Brianza, Costa Masnaga, Cremella, Dolzago, Ello, Galbiate, Garlate, Garbagnate Monastero, Imbersago, La Valletta Brianza, Lomagna, Merate, Missaglia, Molteno, Montevecchia, Monticello Brianza, Nibionno, Oggiono, Olgiate Molgora, Olginate, Osnago, Paderno d'Adda, Robbiate, Rogeno, Santa Maria Hoè, Sirone, Sirtori, Suello, Valgreghentino, Verderio, Viganò

Complete list of towns

Zone of Lecco 
 Abbadia Lariana
 Ballabio
 Civate
 Galbiate
 Lecco
 Malgrate
 Mandello del Lario
 Morterone
 Oliveto Lario
 Pescate
 Valmadrera

Zone of Oggiono 
 Annone di Brianza
 Bosisio Parini
 Cesana Brianza
 Colle Brianza
 Costa Masnaga
 Dolzago
 Ello
 Garbagnate Monastero
 Molteno
 Oggiono
 Rogeno
 Sirone
 Suello

Zone of Valsassina 
 Barzio
 Casargo
 Cassina V.
 Cortenova
 Crandola V.
 Cremeno
 Introbio
 Margno
 Moggio
 Pagnona
 Parlasco
 Pasturo
 Premana
 Primaluna
 Taceno

Zone of San Martino Valley 
 Calolziocorte
 Carenno
 Erve
 Garlate
 Monte Marenzo
 Olginate
 Valgreghentino
 Vercurago

Zone of Merate 
 Airuno
 Brivio
 Calco
 Cernusco L.
 Imbersago
 La Valletta Brianza
 Lomagna
 Merate
 Montevecchia
 Olgiate Molgora
 Osnago
 Paderno d’Adda
 Robbiate
 Santa Maria Hoè
 Verderio

Zone of Casatenovo 
 Barzago
 Barzanò
 Bulciago
 Casatenovo
 Cassago Brianza
 Castello Brianza
 Cremella
 Missaglia
 Monticello B.
 Nibionno
 Sirtori
 Viganò

Zone of eastern Lario 
 Bellano
 Colico
 Dervio
 Dorio
 Esino Lario
 Lierna
 Perledo
 Sueglio
 Valvarrone
 Varenna
 Vendrogno

References

External links

 Official website 

 
Lecco
Lecco
States and territories established in 1992
1992 establishments in Italy